Dimitris Papadakis (born 22 August 1966), is a Cypriot politician, who since July 2014 has served as a Member of the European Parliament, representing Cyprus for the Movement for Social Democracy.

Parliamentary service
Member, Committee on Foreign Affairs
Member, Delegation to the EU-Russia Parliamentary Cooperation Committee

References

Living people
1966 births
Movement for Social Democracy MEPs
MEPs for Cyprus 2014–2019
People from Famagusta
MEPs for Cyprus 2019–2024